Chamell Gernell Asprilla Alarcón (born 11 August 1998) is a Panamanian footballer currently playing for Panamanian club Árabe Unido in the Liga Panameña de Fútbol.

International career
At the youth level he played in the 2015 CONCACAF U-17 Championship qualifiers and the 2017 CONCACAF U-20 Championship.

Asprilla made his senior international debut for Panama on October 24, 2017, during a friendly match against Grenada.

Career statistics

International

References

Living people
1998 births
Panamanian footballers
Panama youth international footballers
Association football midfielders
C.D. Árabe Unido players
Liga Panameña de Fútbol players
Panama international footballers
Sportspeople from Colón, Panama